Acacia longispicata, commonly known as the slender flower wattle, is a species of Acacia native to eastern Australia.

Description
The bark is smooth toward the tree top and rough and fibrous at the base. It has stout angled branchlets that are tawny yellow to maroon in color. Like most species of Acacia it has phyllodes rather than true leaves. The coriaceous, silvery-green phyllodesa have a very narrowly elliptic to elliptic shape and are flat and slightly sickle shaped.

Distribution
It is endemic area that are north of Mitchell and Theodore extending to around Mount Garnet in Queensland. It is often situated on hillsides and along road-sides growing in sandy red and often skeletal soils as part of Eucalyptus woodland communities.

See also
 List of Acacia species

References

longispicata
Fabales of Australia
Flora of New South Wales
Plants described in 1848